Prosperine is an unincorporated community in northwest Laclede County, in the Ozarks of south central Missouri. The community is located on Route AA, approximately 2.5 miles southwest of Eldridge.

History
A post office called Prosperine was established in 1900, and remained in operation until 1952. The community's founder expected the settlement to prosper, hence the name.

References

Unincorporated communities in Laclede County, Missouri
Unincorporated communities in Missouri